Deliver Me is a reality television series airing on Discovery Life. The show is centered on three female doctors in Los Angeles, California who are partners in a high-risk OB/GYN practice.  The show follows a selection of their patients' trials and tribulations with pregnancy as well as the doctors' own lives.  The general theme is depicted in the opening montage: "Three mothers, Three friends, Three doctors -- One practice."  Each doctor narrates the scenes for her own patient or situation.

Dr. Clifford (Cliff) Bochner, the only male doctor to appear regularly (first appeared in episode 1), is a specialist (perinatologist) whom the practice consults for the most difficult cases. Dr. John Jain, a reproductive endocrinologist and Dr. Hill's ex-husband, appeared in a few episodes when Dr. Hill had eggs frozen for later implantation and for Dr. Bohn's successful in-vitro fertilization (featured in Season 3).

The series premiered on Discovery Health Channel on March 4, 2008. Season 3 began on June 16, 2009 and concluded on October 27, 2009 with a total of ten episodes. Deliver Me was one of two original Discovery Health series (the other was Mystery Diagnosis) to be continued when the channel was replaced by OWN in January 2011. Season 4 debuted May 1, 2011 and ended November 19, 2011.  When OWN cancelled the series, reruns moved to Discovery Health's replacement, Discovery Fit & Health, now known as Discovery Life.

Other projects
The trio also hosted a July 16, 2010 Discovery Health "Baby Week 2010" special about The 10 Most Unbelievable Births shown on the channel (including their series, I'm Pregnant and..., and I Didn't Know I Was Pregnant), and wrote The Mommy Docs' Ultimate Guide to Pregnancy and Birth (with Melissa Jo Peltier), published May 3, 2011.

Episodes
Episode dates from TVGuide.com.

Season 1 (2008)

Season 2 (2008-2009)

Season 3 (2009)

Season 4 (2011)

Spin-offs

Deliver Me: Home Edition
Deliver Me: Home Edition ran on Discovery Health from December 26, 2008 to May 1, 2009.  This 30 episode half-hour update series differs from the main series in that Rebecca Flint narrates the entire episode, it covers one or two pregnancies from earlier Deliver Me episodes from start to finish plus a follow-up with the families 9–10 months later (hence the "Home Edition" tag), and does not include the doctors' personal lives.  Reruns of Deliver Me: Home Edition began airing on OWN in February 2011 until cancellation of the main series.

References

External links
 Mommy Docs official web site

2000s American reality television series
2008 American television series debuts
2010s American reality television series
2011 American television series endings
English-language television shows
Discovery Health Channel original programming